Sakarya Atatürk Stadium was a multi-purpose stadium in Adapazarı, Turkey. It was currently used mostly for football matches and was the home stadium of Sakaryaspor. The stadium used to hold 13,216 spectators. It was named after the Turkish statesman Mustafa Kemal Atatürk. In 2018, the stadium was demolished.

References

External links
Venue information

Football venues in Turkey
Buildings and structures in Sakarya Province
Multi-purpose stadiums in Turkey
Süper Lig venues
Sakaryaspor
Things named after Mustafa Kemal Atatürk